Harry Burton may refer to:

 Harry Burton (Egyptologist) (1879–1940), English Egyptologist and archaeological photographer
 Harry Burton (journalist) (1968–2001), Australian journalist and cameraman
 Harry Burton (rugby league) (?–2009), rugby league footballer of the 1950s for Wakefield Trinity
 Harry Burton (RAF officer) (1919–1993)
 Harry Burton (English footballer) (1881/2–1923), footballer for Sheffield Wednesday, West Brom and Scunthorpe United
 Harry Burton (Australian footballer) (1887–1972), Australian rules footballer
 Harry Burton (actor), British actor and director; son of Humphrey Burton; professional stage name of Matthew Burton

See also
Harold Burton (disambiguation)
Henry Burton (disambiguation)